"Joy" is the sixth episode of the fifth season of House and the ninety-second episode overall. It aired on October 28, 2008.

Plot
The episode opens with a single father, Jerry, repeatedly pouring himself a mug of coffee and then dumping it in the sink.  The clock shows just before 8:30 am. He then speaks to his daughter, Samantha, who leaves the house for school.  Overall, the father and daughter's interactions are listless and unemotional, apparently both are unable to experience "joy". Seemingly seconds after Samantha leaves, she returns, while Jerry discovers his coffee maker missing from the counter and questions Samantha why she is home, to which she responds, "It's 4:30 in the afternoon, and I live here." Jerry realizes he has lost time or must have blacked out while she was gone and does not know what's wrong. At Princeton-Plainsboro, Cuddy assigns his case to House.

Foreman figures out from pupil examination that the man is a somnambulist, and Taub and Thirteen are assigned to follow the patient during his sleepwalking episodes. They discover he is buying cocaine while asleep. The team approach the dealer that sold the cocaine to Jerry and ask to buy it themselves, hoping to find the answer to his condition.  After running tests, they discover it was cut with lactose. House deduces that the man is lactose-intolerant and treats him, but Jerry's condition continues to deteriorate, as Taub notices he is sweating blood during an examination and his kidneys are failing. House persuades Samantha to donate a kidney to her father.  Her monotone expression and one-word answers prompt him to realize that she is a sleepwalker too, and is suffering from the same condition as her father.

Meanwhile, Cuddy meets with Becca, the mother of the baby she is hoping to adopt. Cuddy is curious to know why Becca chose her to adopt her baby, and she is told that her father and grandfather were abusive men, and that she did not want her baby going through that as well, and also the fact that Cuddy's credentials impressed her.  Cuddy notices Becca has an odd rash on her arm, and she hospitalizes her in order to treat her. She and Cameron perform an ultrasound and see that the baby's lungs are underdeveloped.  Cameron orders a treatment of steroids for Becca, but it causes Becca to have a sub-uterine bleed. Cuddy is extremely concerned for the baby's health, which draws House's attention. He insults Cuddy's parenting skills and questions her motives for wanting to be a mother. He also berates her for agreeing with him to deliver the baby now, as that would be a serious risk to the baby's lungs.  Cuddy consults Becca, who asks Cuddy to deliver the baby. She and the surgical team successfully deliver baby Joy via cesarean section, and Joy begins to cry on her own, which means, to the relief of everyone, that her lungs were developed enough for her to breathe on her own.

After a conversation with Wilson, House interviews his patients, and Jerry reveals that he is of Middle-Eastern descent, and changed his Muslim name after the first Iraq invasion to avoid confrontation from others.  House deduces that he and Samantha have familial Mediterranean fever, a genetic condition which caused all their symptoms: anhedonia, vasculitis, lactose intolerance, hematidrosis, and kidney failure. (Medical commentators complain that this presentation does not match the real-life disease.)  After the father and daughter are treated, they are shown smiling, playing and laughing together happily, in stark contrast to their earlier emotionlessness.

While visiting Becca in her room, Cuddy is told by Becca that she had an epiphany while Joy was being born, and saw the sheer bliss on Cuddy's face when she held Joy, calling it "the most beautiful thing I've ever seen". Becca regretfully says she will not put the baby up for adoption. Cuddy is shocked and tries to reason with her but is unsuccessful. Seeing the finality of Becca's decision, Cuddy leaves, heartbroken.  Later that night, House visits a devastated Cuddy at her newly furnished house (in preparation for the baby) and when Cuddy tells him she is finished with trying to have a child, whether through pregnancy or adoption, House says that it's "too bad" because she "would have made a great mother". Cuddy is shocked at first, then becomes angry and demands why House always negates every situation because he was the one who had said that she would "suck" as a mother ("Finding Judas"), yet now he is suddenly saying she would be a great mother. House looks at her regretfully and quietly responds that he does not know why. Cuddy's expression changes and then, in that tense moment, House and Cuddy passionately kiss, and the episode ends with a cliffhanger as House quietly says "good night" and walks out the door with Cuddy staring after him, saying a confused "good night".

References

External links
 
 
 

House (season 5) episodes
2008 American television episodes

fr:Rêves éveillés